The Congolese National Police (PNC) is the national police force of the Democratic Republic of the Congo. The national police consists of 110,000–150,000 officers and operates on the provincial level, answering to the Interior Ministry. It is known in the DRC for corruption, repression of political dissidents, and other human rights abuses. It is currently undergoing reforms. A police academy is being built.

The current Police Commissioner General is Dieudonne Amuli Bahigwa, a former Congolese army officer, who replaced Charles Bisengimana in July 2017.

The former Kinshasa Police Commissioner, General Celestin Kanyama, was sanctioned by the United States in 2016 for his role in repressing citizens during anti-government protests using violence. He was removed from his post in 2017.

History

The legislation "Decree-Law N° 002-2002 On institution, organization and functioning of the Congolese national police" from 26 January 2002 establishes the role of the National Police (PNC) of the DRC.

Starting in 2014, about 150 police officers part of the "Formed Police Unit" were deployed to the neighboring Central African Republic as part of a peacekeeping contingent, along with 850 FARDC troops. 

In February 2019 Human Rights Watch accused the Congolese police of extrajudicially executing dozens of people during a crackdown on gangs in Kinshasa.

In March 2022, first lady, Denise Nyakéru Tshisekedi visited the Congolese National Police in Kinshasa during training. They were working with MONUSCO police concerning gender mainstreaming in peacekeeping operations.

Organization
Directorate of Public Security
Directorate of General Information
Civil Protection directorate
Border Police directorate
Directorate of Fluvial, lacustrine, maritime and train communication route
Technical and Scientific directorate
Directorate for the Fight against Criminality
Directorate of Telecommunications and New Technologies
Directorate for the Fight against Economic and Financial Crime
Narcotic directorate
Judicial Identity and Central File directorate
National Central Bureau / Interpol
Human Resources directorate
Directorate of Budget and Finance
Directorate of Logistics
Directorate of Studies and Planning
International Police Cooperation’s Department

See also
Law enforcement in the Democratic Republic of the Congo
Crime in the Democratic Republic of the Congo

References

Further reading

Law enforcement agencies of the Democratic Republic of the Congo